Gang of Çole ( or Banda e Zani Çaushit) was an Albanian criminal group that operated in the city of Vlora during 1997–2001. The peak of their criminal activity was during March–June 1997, when anarchy reigned in the South. Gang members were charged with the creation of the criminal group, possession of military vehicles, homicides, kidnappings, giving penitence, destruction of state institutions, drug trafficking.

Gang activity
The gang was created by Myrteza Çaushi also known as Zani, the strongman of Vlora, in March 1997. The Gang of Çole is named after the Çole neighborhood in Vlorë.

The group had sixteen members, most already with criminal records. Myrteza Çaushi was imprisoned in a high security prison in Greece after being convicted of serious criminal offences. In February 1997, he escaped from prison and returned to southern Albania, where, taking advantage of the unrest, he established the gang known as Çole along with some friends from his neighbourhood. They became known throughout the country for committing heinous crimes.

Chronology of the Çole gang
 March 1997: Formed the gang. Worked closely with Vlora Rescue Committee.
 7 May 1997: taken hostage by dealer Artur Gjoshi and his friend Pellumb Petriti of Tepelenë. This event brought a fierce clash between the gangs of Vlorë and Tepelenë.
 8 May 1997: Foto Kola trader kidnapped, then released for 500,000 Lek torture.
 9 May 1997: Bernard Duçka, nicknamed "Kuqo", who had gone to mediate the release of Gjoshi was killed. Opponents, seeking revenge, grabbed Niko, Avdyl Bajrami, killing them.
 11 May 1997: Killed Neritan and Edmond Dedenika.
 19 May 1997: Killed Arben Latifi, a close friend and Zani,  Zani killed Niko Borakun after having tortured him.
 July 1997: hijacked Sokol Kamberi.
 28 September 1997: Seized Zani Çaushi and members of his gang.
 5 August 1997: intended to be levied a fine of 10 million Italian lireta Laprake, Tirana.
 23 June 1997: Kidnapped the Mayor of Novosela, Kanan Shakaj, tortured and released after paying 200 million Lek.
 1998:Zani and friends arrested. 
 1999: Zani arrested back. 
2000: Caushi back to Gjykata e Tiranes.
2001:Zani arrested and sentenced to life .

Relations with Committee of Rescue and politics
The Gang of Çole became the main supporter of the Salvation Committee of Vlore, returning to the armed forces of the Committee. Zani guaranteed the gathering Rescue Committee delegates from across the country, at their meeting on 28 March 1997. Also he was the bodyguard of Italian Prime Minister Romano Prodi during his visit to southern Albania in April 1997, after the Otranto tragedy. However the relationship between Albert Zani and Shyti, Chairman of the Committee of Salvation were not good. 

On 19 April 1997, the Italian newspaper "Corriere della Sera" stated: "Zani is nothing. A member of the Committee, he works alone. You Italians give him more importance. I'm the only one who contends against Sali Berisha. I'm the leader!" Zani was supportive of the Socialist Party and an opponent of Berisha. He was the bodyguard of Skender Gjinushi during the campaign for the June 1997 elections. 

Head Police Commissariat of Vlora, "Milton Scimitar" set in the post by the Rescue Committee in March 1997, stated to the "Corriere della Sera" that: "In the South there are five bands. Zani's gang is an association that helps people get weapons. There are 12 people that do not cause problems. Zani is one of many compatriots."

Rival gangs
In southern Albania during the riots of 1997, five bands were formed. Three of them were rivals of Zani: Gang of Gaxhai, Gang of Kakami and Gang of Pusi i Mezinit. The latter was eliminated in the Massacre of Levan on 28 March 1997. According to an Izet Haxhia's evidence, this band was launched to eliminate Zani and the Rescue Committee members, who were gathered in Vlora, but were detected by state police. 

The greatest rival of Zani's gang was the gang of Gaxhai. The clash between them began on 9 May 1997, when  Gaxhai's gang member, Bernard, known as Red, was killed. In response, Gaxhai attempted to take police armored vehicles to fight with Zani, but he didn't succeed. When the riots ended the members of two gangs were arrested.

References
Koha Jonë: Kapet miku i Zanit, bllokoi rruget ne protesta
Lufta 8-vjeçare e kapove pas vrasjes së Kuqos 
Gazeta Shekulli: Ekzekutohet për hakmarrje plaku i Gërdhuqëve 
Gazeta Standard: Banda e Zanit merr 102 vjet burg
YouTube: Exclusive Top Channel, Viti 1997
Corriere Della Sera:  Zani është bosi i rremë i Vlorës
Viti 97, Mero Baze: Pasojat e Anarkisë
Agjencia Telegrafike Shqiptare:Kapet Zani Çaushi
Rilindja Demokratike:  Krimi dhe "Robin Hoodët" e PS

External links
Zan Çaushi interview

Albanian Civil War
1997 in Albania
Albanian Mafia
Cole